The Banggai fruit dove (Ptilinopus subgularis), also called maroon-chinned fruit dove is a species of bird in the family Columbidae.  It is endemic to the Banggai Islands.  Its natural habitat is subtropical or tropical moist lowland forests. It is threatened by habitat loss.

Description
The Banggai Fruit Dove, or Ptilinopus subgularis, is a large gray and green dove that lives in the Banggai Islands. It is also a species in the bird family Columbidae. The bird’s upperparts are forest green like and the bottom fades to a pale gray. It also features a deep red vent on the side, a small maroon chin, and a maroon base accented by the yellow beak. The fruit dove’s chest is also buff and flares out slightly. The legs and feet of the bird can range from red to purple-red. There are few differences between the male and female birds, but the females tend to have more green on their necks.

Conservation status
The Banggai Fruit Dove is threatened by habitat loss and is on the endangered species list. As of 2014, there are between 2500-9999 birds left standing. There are limited resources that we have on this bird because it is so rare, however, more research is being done to investigate the lifestyle.

Range
Some of the Banggai Fruit Doves have slight variations. They can have various combinations of their color balance. The pale underside is more magnified in some and not as much in others. However, the maroon colored chin and maroon based yellow beaks are distinguishing factors. These attributes are more limited in range of qualities. In terms of location, the bird is found in select locations in the Indonesian islands, specifically the Banggai Islands.

Taxonomy
Prior to 2014, Ramphiculus subgularis or Ptilinopus subgularis was known as the Maroon-chinned fruit dove, and also encompassed what is now Oberholser's fruit dove (Ptilinopus epia) and the Sula fruit dove (Ptilinopus mangoliensis), following Sibley and Monroe (1990, 1993).

Ecology
The ecology of the Banggai Fruit Dove examines how the bird interacts with its surroundings.

Vocalization: The song of the Banggai Fruit Dove is known and recognized as a long series of “whoop” notes. There are typically around 20 notes in the series and the call will last for 2.7 seconds. It may be shorter or longer, but when broken down that comes to 0.07 seconds per note. 

Diet: The bird is recognized for taking fruits off of branches of trees to gain nutrition and they use their strong beak to crack open hard-shelled fruits.

Habitat: Banggai Fruit Doves are arboreal, meaning that they live exclusively in the trees. Because the species is so rare, there is not much information on how they form their shelter. However, a basic platform nest was sited in early May. The nest was a platform consisting of small branches that are found in the montane forest. Montane ecosystems are characterized to be located on the sides of mountains with a correlation between climate and elevation.

Location
They are found in Indonesia and are natural to the Banggai Islands. The birds mainly thrive in the forest regions. Specifically, the subtropical or tropical moist lowlands. However, this environment is degrading and leaving the Banggai Fruit Dove without a home. The cause of this environmental degradation is mainly subject to global climate change. The factors of climate change that are having the greatest impact are earthquakes, droughts, volcanic eruptions, and mudslides.

References

Banggai fruit dove
Endemic birds of Sulawesi
Banggai fruit dove